"Fancy Pants" is a song written by Floyd Cramer and was recorded by Al Hirt for his 1965 album, That Honey Horn Sound. The song reached #47 on the Billboard Hot 100 and #9 on the Adult Contemporary chart in 1965.

Floyd Cramer released his own version of the song in 1953 for the Abbott Records label.

References

1965 singles
Al Hirt songs
Song recordings produced by Chet Atkins
RCA Records singles
1965 songs
Songs written by Floyd Cramer